TVLine is a website devoted to information, news, and spoilers of television programs.

History
In late 2010, Entertainment Weeklys Michael Ausiello announced that he would be leaving EW after nearly two years in their employ to establish a TV-centered website with PMC, the media company founded by Jay Penske. He later announced that fellow EW writer Michael Slezak, E! Online's Megan Masters, and TV Guides Matt Mitovich would be joining him in the venture.

The site debuted January 5, 2011, and more than tripled initial expectations for internet traffic in its first six days.

In early 2011 a report by TV by the Numbers analyzed the pageview ratings for four television websites: TVLine, its sister site Deadline, TheWrap, and TV by the Numbers itself. With a high of just over 1 million daily pageviews, TVLine beat all three competitors. A similar report in summer 2012 compared TVLine again to three other websites: Deadline, The Hollywood Reporter, and HitFix. TVLine hit a high of approximately 23 million monthly pageviews, second only to The Hollywood Reporter.

References

External links
 
 About TVLine at PMC

Penske Media Corporation
Television websites
Internet properties established in 2011